A cheerleader is a person who does cheerleading.

Cheerleader(s) may also refer to:

Film and television
 "Cheerleader" (2002), an episode of the TV show 8 Simple Rules
 The Cheerleaders (1973), American comedic film

Literature and publishing
 Cheerleader (2005–2007), a book trilogy by Kate Brian
 The Cheerleader (1991), a book by Caroline B. Cooney
 The Cheerleader (1974), a book by Ruth Doan MacDougall
 The Cheerleader (1985), a book by Norma Klein

Music
 Cheerleader (band), an indie pop band from Philadelphia, PA.
 "Cheerleader" (song), a 2012 song by OMI
 "Cheerleader", a 2009 song by Grizzly Bear from their album Veckatimest
 "Cheerleader", a 2011 song by St. Vincent from her album Strange Mercy
 "Cheerleader", a 2015 song by Pentatonix from the deluxe version of their album Pentatonix